Seol Young-woo (born 5 December 1998) is a South Korean footballer. He currently plays for Ulsan Hyundai.

Honours
Club
 K League 1: 2022

Individual
 K League Young Player of the Year: 2021
 Korean FA Young Player of the Year: 2021

References

External links
Profile at Soccerway

1998 births
Living people
Sportspeople from Ulsan
Association football defenders
Association football fullbacks
South Korean footballers
Ulsan Hyundai FC players
K League 1 players
University of Ulsan alumni
Footballers at the 2020 Summer Olympics
Olympic footballers of South Korea